Nneji is a surname, it is found in Igbo language of southern Nigeria. It roughly translates to English as "mother".

People with Nneji as a surname 
 Frank Nneji, is the founder and CEO of the Associated Bus Company (ABC), a businessman from Nigeria.
 Tobechi Nneji, is a Nigerian radio personality, and television host.
Victoria Chibuogu Nneji, is a Nigerian-born American computer scientist, design and innovation strategist, and a lecturing fellow.
 Victoria Nneji, is a Nigerian Paralympian athlete

References 

Surnames
Lists of people by surname
Igbo-language surnames